The Ghost Galleon also known as El buque maldito, is a 1974 Spanish horror film written and directed by Amando de Ossorio and starring Jack Taylor. It has numerous alternate titles, including The Blind Dead 3, Horror of the Zombies and Ship of Zombies. In Germany it was released as The Ghost Ship of the Swimming Corpses (German: Das Geisterschiff der schwimmenden Leichen), though the German theatrical poster also has the title The Ghost Ship of the Blind Dead on it.

The film is the third in Ossorio's "Blind Dead" series, and the sequel to Tombs of the Blind Dead (1972) and Return of the Blind Dead (1973). It was followed by the final entry, Night of the Seagulls (1975).

Plot
A pair of swimsuit models are out in a boat to stage a publicity stunt by appearing to be stranded. They discover a mysterious galleon shrouded in mist and board it. One of the models' roommates, a fellow model who has a lesbian crush on her friend confronts the owner of the modeling agency, who hired them out to her friend; a wealthy and unscrupulous businessman behind the publicity stunt. The roommate is taken hostage when she discovers that her friend has gone missing and is raped by one of the businessmen's henchmen. The businessman, the head of the modeling agency recruit an eccentric scholar to assist them in their search for the missing models and their boat, taking the roommate with them as they can not allow her to reveal the truth about the incident to the public.

The phantom galleon carries the coffins of the Knights Templar, eyeless mummies who hunt humans by sound. The two models are killed before the rescue party arrives. The rescue party also board the galleon, then discover their ship has vanished. The abducted girl is captured and dragged into the depths of the ship to be dismembered and eaten, while the rest of the group is locked in an unnatural sleep. The survivors struggle to repel and combat the spectral knights with what little knowledge they have of them.

Cast 
 Maria Perschy as Lillian
 Jack Taylor as Howard Tucker
 Bárbara Rey as Noemi
 Carlos Lemos as Professor Grüber
 Manuel de Blas as Sergio
 Blanca Estrada as Kathy
 Margarita Merino as Lorena Kay

Release
The film has been released multiple times on DVD over the years. It was first released on DVD on December 3, 2002 by BCI. Blue Underground later released a limited edition version on September 27, 2005; Anchor Bay Entertainment released another version of the film later that same year. The film was last released on DVD by Desert Island Films on August 1, 2012.

Reception
TV Guide awarded the film 1 out of 4 stars, criticizing the pacing of the first hour of the film as being too slow, yet praised the film's atmosphere and ending. Writing in The Zombie Movie Encyclopedia, academic Peter Dendle said that "although the essential ingredients of de Ossorio's tried recipe are present, ... here they aren't as well exploited as the first two movies". Glenn Kay, who wrote Zombie Movies: The Ultimate Guide, called it the worst of the series. Reviewing the Blue Underground DVD, Adam Tyner wrote, "The Ghost Galleon is still a drastic improvement over The Return of the Evil Dead, and deeply flawed though it may be, the movie holds some sort of bizarre, inexplicable charm".

References

External links
 

1974 films
1974 horror films
Knights Templar in popular culture
Spanish zombie films
Blind Dead films
Films directed by Amando de Ossorio
Seafaring films
Spanish supernatural horror films
Films scored by Antón García Abril
Publicity stunts in fiction
1970s Spanish-language films